Partido Demócrata Cristiano may refer to:

 Partido Demócrata Cristiano (Argentina), a political party in Argentina
 Partido Demócrata Cristiano (Bolivia), a political party in Bolivia
 Partido Demócrata Cristiano de Chile, a political party in Chile
 Partido Demócrata Cristiano (El Salvador), a political party in El Salvador
 Partido Demócrata Cristiano, former name of the People's Party in Panama
 Partido Demócrata Cristiano (Paraguay), a political party in Paraguay
 Christian Democrat Party (Peru)
 Partido Demócrata Cristiano del Uruguay, a political party in Uruguay

See also
Christian Democratic Party (disambiguation)